Małgorzata Zadura (born October 3, 1982 in Lubań) is a retired Polish hammer thrower. Zadura represented Poland at the 2008 Summer Olympics in Beijing, where she competed for the women's hammer throw, along with her compatriots Anita Włodarczyk and Kamila Skolimowska. She performed the best throw of 64.13 metres on her second attempt, finishing thirty-eighth overall in the qualifying rounds.

Her personal best in the event is 70.36 metres, set in 2010 in Lublin.

Competition record

References

External links

NBC 2008 Olympics profile

Polish female hammer throwers
Living people
Olympic athletes of Poland
Athletes (track and field) at the 2008 Summer Olympics
People from Lubań
1982 births
Sportspeople from Lower Silesian Voivodeship
Competitors at the 2009 Summer Universiade